Wieliczna may refer to the following places in Poland:
Wieliczna, Lower Silesian Voivodeship (south-west Poland)
Wieliczna, Masovian Voivodeship (east-central Poland)